Frederick (Fredrak) W. Fraske (March 8, 1872 – June 18, 1973) is believed to have been the last surviving veteran of the Indian Wars.

Biography
Fraske was an ethnic German born in the city of Posen, which was at that time in the Province of Posen and part of the Kingdom of Prussia. As a young child in 1877, he migrated to the United States with his family, including his parents and four brothers. At the age of 21, on February 22, 1894, in Chicago, which was his home town, he enlisted in the U.S. Army to help his widowed mother support her family of seven. He was assigned to Fort D.A. Russell, which was near Cheyenne, Wyoming, serving as a private with company F of the 17th infantry as a first aid man and letter carrier. He spoke about Cheyenne of that time as a quiet but wild town, where cattle were unloaded, and the residents were a tough breed.

His starting pay in the Army was the standard $9 a month, and then it increased $1 each year. The time that he was in the service was spent preparing for confrontation at the fort, which never occurred. Fraske commented on the fact that he was glad that he never fired a shot in battle with American Indians, and didn't feel any ill will towards them either. He also felt that he understood the difficult position they were in. Fraske never personally had anything other than peaceful encounters with them.

In that era, the Army allowed a soldier to be discharged after three years and three months of service instead of serving the full five years, if requested by a soldier with excellent character, and so Fraske took advantage of that law and left the Army in 1897, at the age of 25.

After his service ended, he returned to Chicago and worked as a building painter for nearly 40 years, retiring because union work rules didn't allow anyone over age 65 to climb scaffolds. He continued working as a security guard for the Salerno-McGowan Biscuit company for the next 23 years, and then retired at age 88. At the time of his death at age 101, he was living with his daughter Lillian in Chicago, and was receiving part-time nursing assistance from the Veterans Administration. He was buried at St. Adalbert Cemetery in Niles, Illinois.

See also

Last surviving United States war veterans
John Daw

References

External links
Fredrak Fraske

1872 births
1973 deaths
American centenarians
Men centenarians
American people of the Indian Wars
German emigrants to the United States
People from the Province of Posen
United States Army soldiers